Aleksander Sekulić (born 24 February 1978) is a Slovenian professional basketball coach, who is current head coach of the Slovenia national team and Lokomotiv Kuban of the VTB United League.

Head Coaching Record

Domestic Leagues

|- 
| align="left"|KK Krka 
| align="left"|2012-13
| 15 || 13 || 2 ||  || align="center"|Won championship 
|- 
| align="left"|LTH Castings
| align="left"|2015-16
| 36 || 23 || 13 ||  || align="center"|
|- 
| align="left"|KK Primorska
| align="left"|2016-17
| 42 || 29 || 13 ||  || align="center"|
|- 
| align="left"|Basketball Nymburk
| align="left"|2021-22
| 36 || 35 || 1 ||  || align="center"|
|-class="sortbottom"
| align="center" colspan=2|Career||129||100||29||||

References

External links 
 FIBA Profile  
 KZS Profile

1978 births
Living people
KK Koper Primorska coaches
KK Krka coaches
Olympic coaches
PBC Lokomotiv-Kuban coaches
Slovenian basketball coaches
Sportspeople from Ljubljana
Slovenian expatriate sportspeople in the Czech Republic